Flip Kowlier (pseudonym of Filip Willy Mariette Cauwelier, born 15 March 1976 in Izegem, West Flanders) is a Belgian singer-songwriter. He sings in a distinct West Flemish dialect. He is an MC with the hip hop group, 't Hof van Commerce. And in his solo work he sings and plays guitar, with Karel De Backer and Joost Van den Broeck on drums, Peter Lesage on keyboards and Pieter Van Buyten on bass guitar.

Discography

Albums

Studio albums

Compilation albums

Singles

*Did not appear in the official Belgian Ultratop 50 charts, but rather in the bubbling under Ultratip charts.

References

External links
 Official website
 Belgian pop and rock archives

1976 births
Living people
People from Izegem
Belgian male singers
Belgian rappers
Belgian singer-songwriters
Dutch-language singers of Belgium